North Harrow is a London Underground station situated in North Harrow in North West London. The station is on the Metropolitan line between Harrow-on-the-Hill (southbound) and Pinner (northbound). Fast Metropolitan line and Chiltern Railways services pass by using two of the four tracks. It has won Transport for London awards for best customer service in 2009 and 2010.

History
The Metropolitan Railway began running services through here on 25 May 1885 with the opening of its Pinner extension. North Harrow station opened on 22 March 1915. The station was rebuilt in 1930 to the designs of Charles Clark as part of the Metropolitan Railway's modernisation programme.

Currently the art on display are photocopied pictures of local people painted over with coloured paint in various places, made by a local disabled children's group. It has two main exits but in recent years only one is in use, towards the town centre, presumably due to setup of the barriers not requiring both. There is a direct door into a neighbouring florist. The area under the railway bridge outside the exit to the station is prone to flooding at times due to its low-lying position.

Services
In the northbound direction the station is served by trains to Watford (4tph), Amersham (2tph) and Chesham (2tph) trains (at peak times, 'fast' trains do not stop at stations between Harrow-on-the-Hill and Moor Park). In the southbound direction off-peak services generally run 4tph to Baker Street and 4tph to Aldgate.

Connections
London Buses routes H9 and H10 serve the station.

References

Gallery

Metropolitan line stations
Tube stations in the London Borough of Harrow
Former Metropolitan and Great Central Joint Railway stations
Railway stations in Great Britain opened in 1915